This Is Arashi is the seventeenth studio album by Japanese idol group Arashi, released through J Storm on November 3, 2020. It was the group's final recording before entering an indefinite hiatus on December 31, 2020. It was preceded by and includes the singles "Brave"; "Turning Up"; their first song primarily in English, "In the Summer"; "Kite"; their first entirely English song, "Whenever You Call"; and "Party Starters". "Do You...?" served as the lead song upon the album's release on November 3.

The limited edition of the album includes a second disc with all songs from Arashi's 2020 digital EP Arashi Reborn Vol.1 and the other "Reborn" re-recordings of their earlier tracks, as well as a DVD or Blu-ray featuring the music videos for the singles.

This Is Arashi debuted at number one on the Oricon Albums Chart, selling over 699,000 copies in its first week.

The album was released for digital download and streaming on December 11, 2020.

Promotion
An online concert pre-recorded without an audience at the Japan National Stadium in Tokyo was streamed in promotion of the album on November 3, the day of the album's release. The concert, AraFes (short for Arashi Festival), had been postponed from May 2020 due to the COVID-19 pandemic.

Arashi performed "Do You...?" on Music Station on November 6.

Track listing

Charts

Weekly charts

Year-end charts

References

2020 albums
Arashi albums
J Storm albums